Events in the year 2022 in Trinidad and Tobago.

Incumbents
 President: Paula-Mae Weekes
 Prime Minister: Keith Rowley
 Chief Justice: Ivor Archie
 Leader of the Opposition: Kamla Persad-Bissessar

Events
Ongoing — COVID-19 pandemic in Trinidad and Tobago

 July 2 – Tropical Storm Bonnie: One person is reported missing as Tropical Storm Bonnie makes landfall in South America.

Deaths
 January 1 – Mighty Bomber, 93, calypsonian.
 January 2 – Kenny J, 69, calypsonian and Assistant Commissioner of Police.
 January 6 – Clive Zanda, 82, jazz musician.
 January 10 – Deon Lendore, 29, sprinter, Olympic bronze medallist (2012), traffic collision.
 February 27 – Sonny Ramadhin, 92, West Indies cricketer.
 March 12 – Selwyn Ryan, 86, Trinidad and Tobago political scientist.
 October 7 – Austin Stoker, 92, actor
 October 16 – Malcolm Patrick Galt, 93, Trinidadian-born Barbadian Roman Catholic prelate, bishop of Bridgetown (1995–2005).
 December 7 – Herbert Volney, 69, jurist and politician,
 December 28 – Black Stalin, 81  calypso musician.

References

 
2020s in Trinidad and Tobago
Years of the 21st century in Trinidad and Tobago
Trinidad and Tobago
Trinidad and Tobago